United Nations Security Council resolution 607, adopted unanimously on 5 January 1988, after recalling Resolution 605 (1987) and being informed of the decision of Israel to continue deportations of Palestinians in the occupied territories, the council reaffirmed the applicability of the Fourth Geneva Convention referring to the protection of civilians in times of war.

The resolution called upon Israel to cease the deportations and abide by its obligations arising from the Geneva Conventions. The council also decided to keep the situation under review.

See also
 Arab–Israeli conflict
 First Intifada
 Israeli–Palestinian conflict
 List of United Nations Security Council Resolutions 601 to 700 (1987–1991)
 United Nations Security Council Resolution 608

References
Text of the Resolution at undocs.org

External links
 

 0607
 0607
Israeli–Palestinian conflict and the United Nations
January 1988 events